Alfred Gwynne Vanderbilt III (born December 20, 1949) is a retired public relations executive. Vanderbilt was heavily involved with bringing the Grammys back to New York and the tall ships  to New York for the 500th anniversary of Columbus discovering America. He is the father of James Platten Vanderbilt, son of Alfred Gwynne Vanderbilt Jr., and the grandson of Alfred Gwynne Vanderbilt. His great-grandfather, Cornelius Vanderbilt II, had been one of America's most revered businessmen; his great-great-grandfather, William Henry Vanderbilt had been the richest man in the world.

Early years
Vanderbilt graduated from The Buckley School in New York in 1964. His family traveled extensively and some of his high school years were spent in other countries before graduating from Loyola High School in New York.

Vanderbilt started a Rock 'n Roll band called The Four Fifths in 1965. The band was signed to Columbia Records and released "If You Still Want Me" and "Have You Ever Loved A Girl", published by Scope Music Inc. (BMI) in November 1966, record JZSP 116493 and 116494.

Career
Vanderbilt did not follow his father into the family horse-racing business, instead forming a career in public relations. Vanderbilt started working as an associate at Carl Byoir & Associations in New York City in 1981, and worked at other firms including Hill and Knowlton, Inc. before starting his own agency, The Vanderbilt Agency, New York City, in 1990 where he was president and chief executive officer before retiring in 2017.

Vanderbilt Cemetery Association
In 2010, Vanderbilt created the Vanderbilt Cemetery Association to preserve the Vanderbilt family mausoleum and cemetery at the Moravian Cemetery in New Dorp on Staten Island, New York.

Personal life
Vanderbilt became engaged to Alison Platten in June 1971  and they married on August 18, 1971. They had two children, James Platten Vanderbilt and Travis Murray Vanderbilt, before divorcing in 2016.

Vanderbilt has organized Vanderbilt family reunions  and lectures about the Vanderbilts.

See also
 Vanderbilt family

References

1949 births
Vanderbilt family
Living people